Pire is a village in the Žepče municipality , Zenica-Doboj Canton, Federation of Bosnia and Herzegovina, Bosnia and Herzegovina.

History 
Until 2001 village Pire was part of the Maglaj municipality.

Demographics 
According to the 2013 census, its population was 338, all Croats.

References

Populated places in Žepče